Kalijeh may refer to:
 Kalijeh, Chadegan, Isfahan Province
 Kalijeh, Semirom, Isfahan Province